Assembly election was held in Indian state of West Bengal in 2011 to elect the members of West Bengal Legislative Assembly as the term of the incumbent government was about to expire naturally. It was held in six phases between 18 April and 10 May 2011 for all the 294 seats of the Vidhan Sabha.

The Trinamool Congress won an absolute majority of seats. Notably, incumbent Chief Minister Buddhadeb Bhattacharjee lost his Jadavpur seat to Trinamool's Manish Gupta by just under 17,000 votes.

The election also marked the defeat of the longest-serving democratically elected Communist government in the world, ending the 34-year rule of the Left Front government, a fact that was noted by the international media.

Background
This was the first legislative assembly election for the Vidhan Sabha since political agitation and violence in Nandigram and the Tata Nano Singur controversy, led by opposition party chief Mamata Banerjee, caused deaths by police firing amidst protests.

The Left Front had governed West Bengal since 1977. The election also followed the defeat of the Left Front in the 2009 general election, as well as its relatively poor showing in Panchayat and municipal elections.

Delimitation

The 2011 election adopted re-drawn electoral constituencies based on the 2001 census, following the 2002 Delimitation Commission of India, whose recommendations were approved in February 2008.

Polling schedule

Chief Election Commissioner of India S. Y. Quraishi announced that polling in West Bengal will be spread over six phases between 18 April and 10 May for the constituencies of the West Bengal Vidhan Sabha.

Phase I
54 constituencies went to the polls:
Mekliganj (SC), Mathabhanga (SC), Coochbehar Uttar (SC), Coochbehar Dakshin, Sitalkuchi (SC), Sitai (SC), Dinhata, Natabari, Tufangunj, Kumargram (ST), Kalchini (ST), Alipurduars, Falakata (SC), Madarihat (ST), Dhupguri (SC), Mayanaguri (SC), Jalpaiguri (SC), Rajganj (SC), Dabgram-Fulbari, Mal (ST), Nagrakata (ST), Kalimpong, Darjeeling, Kurseong, Matigara-Naxalbari (SC), Siliguri, Phansidewa (ST), Chopra, Islampur, Goalpokhar, Chakulia, Karandighi, Hemtabad (SC), Kaliaganj (SC), Raiganj, Itahar, Kushmandi (SC), Kumarganj, Balurghat, Tapan (ST), Gangarampur (SC), Harirampur, Habibpur (ST), Gazole (SC), Chanchal, Harishchandrapur, Malatipur, Ratua, Manikchak, Maldaha (SC), English Bazar, Mothabari, Sujapur, and Baisnabnagar.

Phase II
50 constituencies went to the polls:
Farakka, Samserganj, Suti, Jangipur, Raghunathganj, Sagardighi, Lalgola, Bhagaban Gola, Raninagar, Murshidabad, Nabagram (SC), Khargram (SC), Burwan (SC), Kandi, Bharatpur, Rejinagar, Beldanga, Baharampur, Hariharpara, Naoda, Domkal, Jalangi, Karimpur, Tehatta, Palashipara, Kaliganj, Nakashipara, Chapra, Krishnanagar Uttar, Nabadwip, Krishnanagar Dakshin, Santipur, Ranaghat Uttar Paschim, Krishnaganj (SC), Ranaghat Uttar Purba (SC), Ranaghat Dakshin (SC), Chakdah, Kalyani (SC), Haringhata (SC), Dubrajpur (SC), Suri, Bolpur, Nanoor (SC), Labpur, Sainthia (SC), Mayureswar, Rampurhat, Hansan, Nalhati, and Murarai.

Phase III
75 constituencies went to the polls:
Bagdah (SC), Bongaon Uttar (SC), Bongaon Dakshin (SC), Gaighata (SC), Swarupnagar (SC), Baduria, Habra, Ashoknagar, Amdanga, Bijpur, Naihati, Bhatpara, Jagatdal, Noapara, Barrackpur, Khardaha, Dum Dum Uttar, Panihati, Kamarhati, Baranagar, Dum Dum, Rajarhat New Town, Bidhan Nagar, Rajarhat Gopalpur, Madhyamgram, Barasat, Deganga, Haroa, Minakhan (SC), Sandeshkhali (ST), Basirhat Dakshin, Basirhat Uttar, Hingalganj (SC), Gosaba (SC), Basanti (SC), Kultali (SC), Patharpratima, Kakdwip, Sagar, Kulpi, Raidighi, Mandirbazar (SC), Jaynagar (SC), Baruipur Purba (SC), Canning Paschim (SC), Canning Purba, Baruipur Paschim, Magrahat Purba (SC), Magrahat Paschim, Diamond Harbour, Falta, Satgachia, Bishnupur (SC), Sonarpur Dakshin, Bhangore, Kasba, Jadavpur, Sonarpur Uttar, Tollygunj, Behala Purba, Behala Paschim, Maheshtala, Budge Budge, Metiabruz, Kokata Port, Bhabanipore, Rashbehari, Ballygunge, Chowrangee, Entally, Beleghata, Jorasanko, Shyampukur, Maniktala, and Kashipur-Belgachia.

Phase IV
63 constituencies went to the polls:
Bally, Howrah Uttar, Howrah Madhya, Shibpur, Howrah Dakshin, Sankrail (SC), Panchla, Uluberia Purba, Uluberia Uttar (SC), Uluberia Dakshin, Shyampur, Bagnan, Amta, Udaynarayanpur, Jagatballavpur, Domjur, Uttarpara, Sreerampur, Champdani, Singur, Chandannagore, Chunchura, Balagarh (SC), Pandua, Saptagram, Chanditala, Jangipara, Haripal, Dhanekhali (SC), Tarakeswar, Pursurah, Arambag (SC), Goghat (SC), Khanakul, Tamluk, Panskura Purba, Panskura Paschim, Moyna, Nandakumar, Mahisadal, Haldia (SC), Nandigram, Chandipur, Patashpur, Kanthi Uttar, Bhagabanpur, Khejuri (SC), Kanthi Dakshin, Ramnagar, Egra, Bardhaman Dakshin, Jamalpur (SC), Monteswar, Kalna (SC), Memari, Bardhaman Uttar (SC), Bhatar, Purbasthali Dakshin, Purbasthali Uttar, Katwa, Ketugram, Mangalkot and Ausgram (SC)

Phase V
38 constituencies went to the polls:
Dantan, Keshiary (ST), Kharagpur Sadar, Narayangarh, Sabang, Pingla, Kharagpur, Debra, Daspur, Ghatal (SC), Chandrakona (SC), Keshpur (SC), Purulia, Manbazar (ST), Kashipur, Para (SC), Raghunathpur (SC), Saltora (SC), Chhatnam, Bankura, Barjora, Onda, Bishnupur, Katulpur (SC), Indus (SC), Sonamukhi (SC), Khandaghosh (SC), Raina (SC), Galsi (SC), Pandabeswar, Durgapur Purba, Durgapur Paschim, Raniganj, Jamuria, Asansol Dakshin, Asansol Uttar, Kulti and Barabani.

Phase VI
14 constituencies went to the polls:
Nayagram (ST), Gopiballavpur, Jhargram, Garbeta, Salboni, Medinipur, Binpur (ST), Bandwan (ST), Balarampur, Baghmundi, Joypur, Ranibandh (ST), Raipur (ST) and Taldangra.

Parties
United Progressive Alliance
All India Trinamool Congress (AITC)
Indian National Congress (INC)
Nationalist Congress Party (NCP)
Socialist Unity Centre of India (Communist) (SUCI(C))
Gorkha National Liberation Front (GNLF)
Jharkhand Mukti Morcha (JMM)
Party of Democratic Socialism (India) (PDS)

Left Front (LF)
Communist Party of India (Marxist) (CPM)
Communist Party of India (CPI)
Revolutionary Socialist Party (RSP)
All India Forward Bloc (AIFB)
Revolutionary Communist Party of India (RCPI)
Marxist Forward Bloc (MFB)
Samajwadi Party (SP)
Democratic Socialist Party (DSP(PC))

National Democratic Alliance
Bharatiya Janata Party (BJP)
Gorkha Janmukti Morcha (GJM)

Alliance wise result

Candidates
List of the candidates (constituency wise) of the 3 main parties/alliance:

Campaign
Mamata Banerjee ended her campaign on 9 May in the constituency of the incumbent CM Bhattacharjee in Jadavpur a day after Bhattacharjee appealed to the electorate there to return him to power. Before campaigning ended at 17:00, she appealed to the electorate to "Help me bring about change."

Land reform
Following the general election, with the TMC being an important part of the central government's coalition, the central government eased its controversial land acquisition policy for Special Economic Zones. Part of the proposal was that the government would not get involved in land acquisition for private organizations. One official from the central ruling coalition was quoted as saying that "There is a tacit understanding between these two critical allies that there will be no decision on the Land Acquisition Bill until the results of West Bengal state elections are clear." The issue of land acquisition for development also created a battle zone like situation in the villages between armed cadres of the ruling CPM and the Maoists.

Gorkhaland
During the general election the issue of the founding of Gorkhaland as separate from West Bengal gained prominence along with the victory of Jaswant Singh from Darjeeling constituency for the Bharatiya Janata Party, and supported by the Gorkha Janmukti Morcha (which advocates the creation of a separate Gorkhaland for ethnic Nepalis as opposed to ethnic Bengalis).

Since the election the issue again cropped up as demands for a separate Telangana being bifurcated from Andhra Pradesh grew. During this election CM Bhattacharjee said that Gorkhaland should not be separated but instead an additional development of the region should occur. He said in Lichupokhri that those advocating the separation should "stop your movement for a Gorkhaland. It will never be fulfilled. Concentrate on the all-round development of Darjeeling as it is the only solution to the issue."

Election 
On 17 April, the Election Commission of India issued an appeal for all registered voters to turn out for their respective electoral dates.
 

During the first phase, the Indian border with Bangladesh at the Maldaha constituency was sealed from 16 April, two days before the election, to "prevent miscreants from causing trouble." One-hundred and twelve companies of central paramilitary forces were delegated to man 260 voting booths, 150 of which were decreed to be "sensitive." The district magistrate Rajesh Kumar Sinha also said that 50 booths would be put under round-the-clock online surveillance.

Seven Bengali film stars and theatre personalities won seats with the TMC ticket.

Exit polls

Results 

|-
! style="background-color:#E9E9E9;text-align:left;" width=225|Party
! style="background-color:#E9E9E9;text-align:right;" |Seats contested
! style="background-color:#E9E9E9;text-align:right;" |Seats won
! style="background-color:#E9E9E9;text-align:right;" |Seat change
! style="background-color:#E9E9E9;text-align:right;" |Vote share
! style="background-color:#E9E9E9;text-align:right;" |Swing
|-
| style="text-align:left;" |Trinamool Congress
| style="text-align:center;" | 226
| style="text-align:center;" | 184
| style="text-align:center;" |  154
| style="text-align:center;" | 38.93%
| style="text-align:center;" |  12.29%
|-
|-
| style="text-align:left;" |Communist Party of India (Marxist)
| style="text-align:center;" | 213
| style="text-align:center;" | 40
| style="text-align:center;" |  136
| style="text-align:center;" | 30.08%
| style="text-align:center;" |  7.05%
|-
| style="text-align:left;" |Indian National Congress
| style="text-align:center;" | 66
| style="text-align:center;" | 42
| style="text-align:center;" | 21
| style="text-align:center;" | 9.09%
| style="text-align:center;" |  5.62%
|-
| style="text-align:left;" |All India Forward Bloc
| style="text-align:center;" | 34
| style="text-align:center;" | 11
| style="text-align:center;" |  12
| style="text-align:center;" | 4.80%
| style="text-align:center;" |  0.86%
|-
| style="text-align:left;" |Revolutionary Socialist Party (India)
| style="text-align:center;" | 23
| style="text-align:center;" | 7
| style="text-align:center;" |  13
| style="text-align:center;" | 2.96%
| style="text-align:center;" |  0.75%
|-
| style="text-align:left;" |Gorkha Janmukti Morcha
| style="text-align:center;" | 3
| style="text-align:center;" | 3
| style="text-align:center;" |  3
| style="text-align:center;" | 0.72%
| style="text-align:center;" |  New
|-
| style="text-align:left;" |Communist Party of India
| style="text-align:center;" | 14
| style="text-align:center;" | 2
| style="text-align:center;" | 6
| style="text-align:center;" | 1.84
| style="text-align:center;" |  0.07%
|-
| style="text-align:left;" |Samajwadi Party
| style="text-align:center;" | 5
| style="text-align:center;" | 1
| style="text-align:center;" |  1
| style="text-align:center;" | 0.74%
| style="text-align:center;" |  0.03%
|-
| style="text-align:left;" |Socialist Unity Centre of India (C)
| style="text-align:center;" | 30
| style="text-align:center;" | 1
| style="text-align:center;" |  1
| style="text-align:center;" | 0.44%
| style="text-align:center;" | 
|-
| style="text-align:left;" |Democratic Socialist Party
| style="text-align:center;" | 2
| style="text-align:center;" | 1
| style="text-align:center;" | 
| style="text-align:center;" | 0.35%
| style="text-align:center;" |  0.01%
|-
| style="text-align:left;" |Independents 
| style="text-align:center;" | 
| style="text-align:center;" | 2
| style="text-align:center;" |  4
| style="text-align:center;" | 3.13%
| style="text-align:center;" |  1.09%
|-
| style="text-align:left;" |Bharatiya Janata Party
| style="text-align:center;" | 289
| style="text-align:center;" | 0
| style="text-align:center;" | 
| style="text-align:center;" | 4.06%
| style="text-align:center;" |  2.13%
|- style="background-color:white"
|colspan=13|  
|-
| style="text-align:left;" |Trinamool and allies
| 
| style="text-align:center;" |227
| style="text-align:center;" |192
| 
| 
|- 
| style="text-align:left;" |Left Front
| 
| style="text-align:center;" |62
| style="text-align:center;" |168
| 
| 
|- style="background-color:#E9E9E9"
| style="text-align:left;" |Total|| || style="text-align:center;" |294|| || |||
|-
|style="text-align:left;background-color:#E9E9E9" colspan=7|Turnout:
|-
| style="text-align:left;" colspan="7" | Source: Election Commission of India
|}

By constituency
Source: Election Commission of India — Assembly Elections — May 2011 — Results

Incumbent Chief Minister Buddhadeb Bhattacharya later tendered his resignation to Governor M.K. Narayanan.

On 28 May 2015, INC MLA Rabindranath Chatterjee of Katwa announced he joined the AITMC. It is believed he left the INC because he was tied to the murder of Intrajit Singh, an AITMC supporter, who was killed on the day of the local 2015 Katwa election and wanted to be extricated out of the incident. Chatterjee and seven others were named in Singh's murder.

Reactions

Domestic

 TMC's Mamata Banerjee responded to her victory saying "This is a victory of democracy, victory of Maa, Maati, Manush (mother, land and people). There will be end of autocracy and atrocities." (sic) She thanked the INC chief Sonia Gandhi, who sent congratulatory messages, and Prime Minister Manmohan Singh: "The Prime Minister sent me a congratulatory message from Afghanistan for our victory. I am overwhelmed. I am grateful to him." She also said that the day marked "Communism [a]s history in Bengal, we have won a decisive victory. This is a day of liberation for our people." She also added that the TMC intended to emphasize a return to "true democracy that has been undermined by the communist politics of control" and that her government would promote what she termed a more "inclusive development that benefits rural and urban poor by balancing allocations between agriculture and industry" while seeking a more "efficient" government "especially in terms of maintaining law and order in what has become a fairly violent state." She said "I will continue to live like a commoner because I don't like a luxury. The support of my people is more important. I am against the Left here but not against Leftism. I share the values of the old Left."
 West Bengal CPIM leader Biman Bose said that "We are down, but not out. We will perform our role in opposition and win back the people's trust...[as in Tripura] where the Communists messed up and people brought us back. That will happen in Bengal. They went out of power in 1988 and came back to power five years later...ruling it until now.""
 On CNN-IBN BJP leader Arun Jaitley and fellow national cabinet member Kapil Sibal congratulated Banerjee for the TMC's victory.

International
 : Fellow Bengali and Bangladeshi Prime Minister Sheikh Hasina offered her congratulations to Banerjee. Banerjee told the press that "Sheikh Hasinaji called me and congratulated us on behalf of the people of Bangladesh. I told her our relations have been since the time of Bangabandhu (Mujibur Rahman) and told her that we will work together for betterment. I quoted from Rabindranath Tagore's ‘Amar Sonar Bangla Ami Tomay Bhalobashi’ and told her that both Bangladesh and West Bengal will flourish." (sic)

Media
In the media, she was dubbed as "India's Lech Walesa." Editor Prabhu Chawla said that "Their (Communist) future in Indian politics is in jeopardy. This is an obsolete ideology and will not work here anymore."

Tarun Vijay, the editor of the Organiser Weekly said that "Now Indian politics at the federal level will be more bipolar - with the Congress leading one coalition and the Hindu nationalist BJP leading the other."

Al Jazeera said that the only hope for a Communist resurgence is "if Banerji, 
whose performance as India's railway minister has not been overly impressive, fails in her position of governance." It also said Banerjee's "austere lifestyle appears closer to the old icons of the Bengal communist movement than their successors who had become corrupted by three decades of power."

Academia
Sabyasachi Basu Roy Choudhury of the Calcutta Research Group said that the election was "the most dramatic reversal of fortunes in Bengal's history...The anti-left mass got a powerful leader in Mamata Banerjee and she started to reach out to the floating voters, issue by issue. That explains why the tide has turned against the communists...Bengal's communism was unique in that it grew among the people not through armed revolution. This was a party that grew by consensus by carrying with them all sections of the middle class, rural and urban poor - even the gentry. But somewhere down the line, the arrogance of power led them to adopt narrow, sectarian politics and that is their undoing now."

Pradip Bose said of the results reasons that: "How could a communist government ask the police to fire on peasants as they did in Nandigram to set up a chemical industry. That has eroded their support amongst the rural poor and Mamata Banerji has gained by leading campaigns against the acquisitions." But according to the latest CBI reports, the then C.M. Buddhadev Bhattacharya was awarded a clean-chit for falsely-held allegations of Nandigram police firing against him and his party. Economist Bibek Debroy said that "The Communists were functioning within the parameters of Indian democracy but they tried to create a party whereby they could control all segments of Bengali society. They are paying dearly for their obsession for control because the fiercely independent Bengali middle class would take it no more." Ranabir Sammadar said that: "Within thirteen years of breaking away from the Congress and forming her Trinmool Congress, she has marginalized the Congress in Bengal as much as the communists now. That's a major achievement." Paula Banerji said of the win that it was a "demonstration of the political power of the Bengali women. Now Banerjee has done 'a Hasina' in our state. (sic) Both the Bengals will now be ruled by women and in Bangladesh, even the main opposition leader is a woman. The communists don't have a female leader of Banerji's stature and unless they find one, they cannot take her on."

Analysis
The election result was read as having a significant impact on the national political scene.

The election marked the defeat of the 34-year rule of the CPI (M) government, thereby marking an end to the world's longest-serving democratically elected communist government.

References

External links
 West Bangal General Legislative Election Results at the Election Commission of India

2011 State Assembly elections in India
2011
2010s in West Bengal